The Golden Arena awards were established in 1955 as the Yugoslav national film awards presented annually at the Pula Film Festival in Pula, Croatia, with the Big Golden Arena for Best Film its main prize. From 1955 to 1990 the awards were the Yugoslav cinema equivalent of the Academy Awards. 

The award is named after the Pula Arena, the 1st-century Roman amphitheatre in the coastal city of Pula, where film screenings preceding the awards ceremony traditionally take place. 

In 1991 the festival was cancelled due to the breakup of Yugoslavia, but then resumed in 1992 as the Croatian film awards festival, from then on excluding films and filmmakers from present-day Slovenia, Bosnia and Herzegovina, Montenegro, Serbia, and North Macedonia. It has been held in this format every year since, although no prizes were awarded at the 1994 edition.

The festival's competition program usually includes screenings of all locally produced feature films made in the preceding 12 months, made possible due to the local film industry's relatively low but highly state subsidized output. This means that everyone involved in making them automatically qualifies for the Golden Arena awards. Therefore there are no Academy Award-style lists of nominees announced prior to the actual awarding ceremony. 

The awards are handed out by a jury of five or six members which is named before each festival edition by the festival's managing board. These usually include prominent filmmakers and film critics.

Although the festival was established in 1954, the award for best film was first awarded in 1957 - prior to the 1957 edition, the festival had separate critics' choice and audience awards for best film screened at the festival. Until 1990, the award was always given to the film's production company or companies, except in 1981 when the award was merged with the Golden Arena for Best Director and both the director and production companies of the winning film (The Fall of Italy by Lordan Zafranović) were credited with the award. 

During the Yugoslav period, film production was decentralised with each of the six republics having their own major film production companies. Jadran Film based in Zagreb and Avala Film based in Belgrade were the two most successful, winning 11 and 8 awards respectively. 

In the 1990s the award was intermittently merged with the Best Director award, until 1999 when the old format was briefly re-introduced. Between 2003 and 2007 film directors were credited with the Best Film award, while still being eligible for the separate Best Director award (although on four out of five occasions in this period the same director won both awards for the same film). Since 2008 the award is given to the film's producer.

List of winners

1955–1980
The following table lists all films which were winners of the top three prizes in the period from 1957 to 1980. On four occasions two films shared the same prize - in 1961 and 1965 two films shared the Big Golden Arena, in 1966 two films shared the runner-up award and in 1967 two films shared the third-place award. In addition to this, the 1965 second place prize was not awarded. Shared awards are indicated with an asterisk (*).

Award changes
In 1954 there was no festival jury and separate Critics' Choice and Audience awards were given. The Critics' Choice Award for Best Film went to František Čap's film Vesna, and the Audience Award for Best Film went to Fedor Hanžeković's film Stojan Mutikaša. In the following years both the critics' and audiences' awards were kept in parallel with the festival jury-given Golden Arenas, so the 1954 awards are usually not considered precursors of the present-day Big Golden Arena.
In 1955 a festival jury was introduced for the first time and it was also the first time that the award was officially called Big Golden Arena. Although it was given to the best film's director, it is de facto the first Big Golden Arena for Best Film, and it was won by František Čap for the film Trenutki odločitve.
In 1956 the Best Film award was not given in any form.
From 1957 to 1960 the festival jury ranked three best films of the festival, without giving them an official award.
From 1961 to 1968 the Big Golden Arena was awarded to best film, along with the second place prize called Big Silver Arena and a third place prize called Silver Arena.
From 1969 to 1980 the third place prize was renamed Big Bronze Arena.

1981–1991
In 1981 the second and third place prizes were dropped. The following table lists all winners from 1981 to 1990. The Big Golden Arena was not awarded in 1982.

1992–present
Following the breakup of Yugoslavia which began in the early 1990s and the ensuing Croatian War of Independence, the festival was cancelled in 1991. In 1992 it was re-launched as the Pula Film Festival (as opposed to the Festival of Yugoslav Film as it was known earlier). Award categories and names were unchanged, but the selection was narrowed to Croatian films only, excluding films from the other five republics of Yugoslavia. This meant that the number of films eligible for awards fell sharply, which even led to the cancellation of the 1994 award ceremony, as only one Croatian feature film had been produced in the preceding 12 months.

Footnotes

A.  Although the festival opened on schedule on 26 July 1991 and a press screening of Zrinko Ogresta's film Fragments: Chronicle of a Vanishing was held, the festival board presided by Antun Vrdoljak decided to cancel the entire event in protest against the armed conflict in Slovenia and the escalating hostilities in Croatia. Nine Yugoslav-produced films were supposed to be screened in the national competition program.

B. : In 1994 the national competition program and the awards ceremony were cancelled as only one Croatian feature film had been made over the preceding 12 months (The Price of Life, directed by Bogdan Žižić). The festival was held in spite of this, and the usual screenings were replaced by a retrospective of films produced by the celebrated Zagreb School of Animated Film and a selection of documentaries, while the main program featured premieres of six American cinema releases.

References
General

Specific

External links
Pula Film Festival of Yugoslavian Films (1954–1990) at the Internet Movie Database
Pula Film Festival (1992–present) at the Internet Movie Database
Web archive 1954–2010 at the Pula Film Festival official website 

Pula Film Festival
Lists of films by award
Awards for best film
Croatia-related lists